Gianluca Tonetti (born 21 April 1967 in Erba, Lombardy) is an Italian former road cyclist. He most notably won the Trittico Lombardo in 2001. He also rode in two editions of the Giro d'Italia as well as the 1993 Vuelta a España.

Major results

1984
 1st Giro della Lunigiana
1990
 1st Trofeo dello Scalatore
1991
 6th Coppa Placci
1992
 6th GP Città di Camaiore
1993
 3rd Kaistenberg Rundfahrt
 7th Gran Piemonte
1998
 2nd Piccolo Giro di Lombardia
 2nd GP Capodarco
 3rd Wartenberg Rundfahrt
1999
 3rd GP Industria Artigianato e Commercio Carnaghese
 3rd Giro d'Oro
 10th Trofeo Melinda
2000
 2nd Trofeo dello Scalatore
 3rd Giro del Veneto
 6th Coppa Agostoni
 8th Coppa Placci
 10th GP Industria & Commercio di Prato
2001
 1st Trittico Lombardo
 2nd Trofeo dello Scalatore
 3rd Coppa Agostoni
 4th GP Industria & Commercio di Prato
 5th Overall Brixia Tour
 8th Giro dell'Emilia
 9th Overall Tour de Langkawi
2003
 4th GP Città di Camaiore
 4th Giro d'Oro
 10th Overall Brixia Tour
2004
 10th GP Nobili Rubinetterie
2005
 6th GP Nobili Rubinetterie
 10th GP Industria Artigianato e Commercio Carnaghese

References

1967 births
Living people
Cyclists from the Province of Como
Italian male cyclists